The 1958 Melbourne Grand Prix was a motor race for Formula Libre Racing Cars and Sports Cars by invitation. 
The race was staged at the Albert Park Circuit in Victoria, Australia on 30 November 1958 over 32 laps, a distance of 100 miles (161 km).
It was race 8 of 9 in the 1958 Australian Drivers' Championship.

The race was won by Stirling Moss driving a Cooper T45 for RRC Walker.

Results

Notes:
 Winner's average speed: 98.86 mph
 Fastest lap: Stirling Moss, 1m 50s (102.27 mph), all time outright lap record

References

Further reading
 H. A, C. Russell, Moss wins at Melbourne, Autosport, December 12 1958, pages 758 to 760

Melbourne Grand Prix
Motorsport at Albert Park
November 1958 sports events in Australia